The Best Day2 is the second compilation album by South Korean band Day6, released on December 4, 2019, through Warner Music Japan. It compiles Korean tracks released between 2018 and 2019, the new Japanese songs "Finale" and "If You" as well as the Japanese versions of "Time of Our Life" and "Sweet Chaos". It is also the band's last Japanese album with lead vocalist Jae Park before his termination from JYP Entertainment and departure from the group on December 31, 2021.

Promotion
The single "Finale" was released digitally on October 23, 2019, as a promotional track.

Track listing

Charts

Sales

References

2019 greatest hits albums
Day6 albums
Warner Music Japan albums